Abdelkader Ben Hassen (born 24 September 1969) is a Tunisian footballer. He played in 15 matches for the Tunisia national football team from 1995 to 1998. He was also named in Tunisia's squad for the 1996 African Cup of Nations tournament.

References

External links
 
 

1969 births
Living people
Tunisian footballers
Tunisia international footballers
1996 African Cup of Nations players
Place of birth missing (living people)
Association football forwards
Tunisian football managers
US Ben Guerdane managers
CA Bizertin players
Espérance Sportive de Tunis players